Avraham Osdoba is an Orthodox rabbi and a member of the Chabad Hasidic movement. Rabbi Osdoba serves as a rosh yeshiva in 770 in addition to being a member of the Bais Din Tzedek (Jewish Rabbinical Court) of the Chabad community in Crown Heights, Brooklyn; he is an authority on Halacha (Jewish law), Talmud and Hasidic philosophy.

Rabbi of Crown Heights

As a member of the Crown Heights Beth Din (rabbinical court), Rabbi Osdoba is considered one of the community's chief rabbis (Aramaic, מרא דאתרא (Marah D'Asra)). The rabbinical court is the spiritual and religious body governing the Crown Heights Chabad community. There are currently four rabbis serving on the Beth Din:
HaRav Avraham Osdoba
HaRav Yosef Avraham haLevi Heller
HaRav Aharon Yaakov Schwei
HaRav Yosef Yeshaya Braun

Each hold the title Marah D'Asra. As head of the court, Rabbi Osdoba holds the additional title of Av Beth Din (head of court).

The Crown Heights rabbinical court is funded by the Crown Heights Jewish Community Council (CHJCC), a religious corporation representing the Jewish community of Crown Heights.

Appointment
In 1986, the Lubavitcher Rebbe encouraged the chasidim to vote for the members of the bais din. Rabbi Osdoba along with Rabbi Heller and Rabbi Marlow won the election and they each assumed the title Mara D'Asra. Rabbi Osdoba assumed the role as Av Beth Din (chief rabbi) of the rabbinical court, following the death of Rabbi Yehuda Kalmen Marlow, the court's first head rabbi.

Crown Heights Kashrus
Aside from the usual responsibilities of a community rabbi (officiate weddings etc.) Rabbi Osdoba also administers Crown Heights Kashrus (CHK, a kosher certification agency operating under the Crown Heights rabbinical court.

CHK controversy
In recent years, Rabbi Osdoba's authority as sole administrator of the CHK was challenged by others, including supporters of Rabbis Schwei and Braun arguing that the arbitration panel (Zabl"a) ruled that the CHK should be run by a board of directors and is not a private entity, stating: "There is a need to create a new Vaad HaKashrus, which shall be the executive body of the Rabbis and the Vaad Hakohol. The court however remanded this ruling back to the arbitration panel for clarification  which is yet to reconvene.

References

External links
CHJCC directory for the Beth Din

Living people
21st-century American rabbis
American Hasidic rabbis
Chabad-Lubavitch rabbis
Year of birth missing (living people)